The Mercedes-Benz R-Class is a large luxury MPV introduced by Mercedes-Benz in 2005 for the 2006 model year. Following the success of the smaller A- and B-Class MPVs, Mercedes presented a concept vehicle, Vision GST (Grand Sports Tourer), at the 2002 Detroit Auto Show and a second one presented at the 2004 Detroit Auto Show, subsequently introducing the production version at 2005 New York International Auto Show. The R-Class was manufactured in Vance, Alabama until 2015 when its production was shifted to Mishawaka, Indiana for a smaller volume production until 2017.

The R-Class (W251) shared its platform with the M-Class (W164) and GL-Class (X164) and was available in two wheelbase lengths: standard  and long . The R-Class was sold in the United States and Canada in long wheelbase only. The R-Class in both standard and long wheelbases were sold internationally until the end of 2013 with exception of China where R 320 and R 400 with long wheelbase continued to be sold until 2017.

Updates

2007 changes
Mercedes-Benz announced in May 2007 that the R-Class model range would be expanded with more engine options and availability of rear-wheel-drive system for selected models in addition to 4MATIC all-wheel-drive system. A new smaller 3-litre V6 was available in both petrol and diesel versions. The seating options became more flexible, offering five, six, or seven seats. AMG styling option was added to the extensive list of standard and extra-cost options.

2011 changes
The R-Class received a major update with facelift to the front and rear fascias, grille, side mirrors, and taillights for the model year 2011. The revised model was unveiled at the 2010 New York International Auto Show.

At the same time, the new 5.5-litre V8 motor was introduced to R-Class for the first time since the last R-Class with V8 motors, R 500 and R 63 AMG, were withdrawn from the market in 2007. The reintroduced R 500 was not offered in the North American market. The North American market continued with R 350 4MATIC and R 350 BlueTEC 4MATIC, both in long wheelbase form and with V6 engines only, for 2011 and 2012.

R 63 AMG 4MATIC
The AMG version of the W251, R 63 AMG 4MATIC, was introduced at the 2006 North American International Auto Show as a 2007 model. The R 63 AMG was equipped with same engine, seven-speed AMG Speedshift 7G-TRONIC, and 4MATIC all-wheel-drive system from ML 63 AMG and GL63 AMG. The driver can manually select the gears by pressing the upshift and downshift buttons placed behind the steering wheel spokes if desired. No rear-wheel-drive option was offered in R 63 AMG 4MATIC. Despite its heavy weight, the acceleration was brisk with  time of 4.6 seconds.

A high performance version of R-Class wasn't well-received due to its poor handling dynamics, especially with the heavy V8 engine. With 200 units built for the worldwide sale, this model was the rarest of R-Class and amongst the rarest AMG models. Due to extremely low sales and the lack of advertisement, R 63 AMG was withdrawn from the market in 2007, making it a single model year.

Chinese market
From 2014 to 2017, the long wheelbase R-Class was sold in China only with one engine option in two different power outputs: R 320 4MATIC and R 400 4MATIC. The R-Class enjoyed a steady popularity in China with annual sales between 12,000 and 14,000 units per year. Due to its small sales volume, the production was shifted from Alabama to Indiana where the R-Class for Chinese market was assembled by contract manufacturer AM General from 2015 to 2017.

Technical data

Powertrains
The entry with (Long) in parenthesis denotes availability in both standard and long wheelbases. Otherwise, the entry shows the standard wheelbase only. The Long without parenthesis denotes long-wheelbase version only. The asterisk next to the figures denotes the long-wheelbase R-Class. The double asterisk denotes the optional extra-cost AMG Driver's Package.

Transmissions
All models except for R 350 4MATIC BlueEFFICIENCY, R 400 4MATIC, R 300 CDI BlueEfficiency, and R 350 BlueTEC 4MATIC use seven-speed 7G-TRONIC automatic transmissions. The latter four models use seven-speed 7G-TRONIC plus automatic transmission.

Safety and security
The R-Class scored "Good" in the Insurance Institute for Highway Safety (IIHS) front crash test but "Acceptable" in the side impact crash test due to the excessive load against the dummy's torso. After modifying the seatbelts and interior door trim for the 2009 model year, the IIHS rated the R-class "Good" overall in side impacts allowing the R-Class to receive the Top Safety Pick award.

In the United Kingdom, Thatcham Research's New Car Whiplash Ratings (NCWR) tested the R-Class and awarded it the top "Good" rating overall for its ability to protect occupants against whiplash injuries. Thatcham Research's New Vehicle Security Ratings (NVSR) awarded R-Class with five out of five stars for vehicular theft deterrent and four out of five stars for breaking-in deterrent.

Gallery

Sales
Mercedes targeted 50,000 sales per year, half of those for the North American market. While the initial strong sales of first two model years, 2006 and 2007, the sales fell in 2008 following the recession, reaching less than ten percent of ML-Class sales. Sales continued downward, and R-Class was discontinued in 2012 for the North American market and in 2013 for Europe and other markets — with exception of China where R-Class enjoyed popularity. Mercedes-Benz Metris introduced in 2014 is considered a successor to the R-Class for the North American market.

In Germany, the limited engine choices and lack of available rear-wheel-drive option at the launch led to slow sales with almost 4,500 units sold in 2006. The sales decline followed for a few years despite adding more engine choices and rear-wheel-drive option. The 2011 mid-cycle refresh increased the sales to almost 2,500 before dropping to less than 500 units for the final model year, 2013.

The cause of poor sales performance is hard to attribute, considering multitude of possible reasons. One is the confusing marketing of what R-Class is: Mercedes-Benz tried to persuade the customers that R-Class represented a new category of luxury passenger vehicle with the attribution of station wagon/estate, crossover, SUV, and van rolled into one. Additionally, Mercedes-Benz initially marketed the R-Class as a "Sports Cruiser" and later as a "Family Tourer". It also suffered the "image problem" caused by ill-fated Chrysler Pacifica that looked too similar to R-Class and was similarly sized despite R-Class having more luxury features and better managed launch. Chrysler Division of parent company, DaimlerChrysler, had introduced Pacifica a few years prior to the R-Class introduction, and Pacifica was plagued with production and quality issues as well as poor marketing and severe lack of engine choices. Secondly, the customer preference had shifted away from MPV minivans and vans to CUV and SUV during the late 2000s and most of the 2010s. Thirdly, the Great Recession of 2008-2009 greatly impacted automotive sales and consumer confidence along with a strong increase in fuel price, making R-Class less desirable due to its higher fuel consumption.

The mid-cycle refresh didn't help with sales at all despite an improved fascia appearance more in line with the M-Class and GL-Class and a better interior.

References

External links 

 

R-Class
Crossover sport utility vehicles
Minivans
All-wheel-drive vehicles
Cars introduced in 2006
Rear-wheel-drive vehicles
Motor vehicles manufactured in the United States
2010s cars